Deane Galloway Keller (August 1, 1940 – January 4, 2005) was an American artist, academic and author. Keller was a draftsman, painter, sculptor, and teacher who instructed students in the visual arts for forty years, most notably in figure drawing and the artistic application of human anatomy.  He is credited with explaining that "drawing offers a unique record of an encounter with a culture, of experience transformed from fleeting moment to lasting resonance."

Early life
He was the son of Deane and Katherine Parkhurst Hall Keller.

He earned a Bachelor of Arts degree in Art History from Yale University, where he studied under his father, and a Master of Arts in Education from St. Joseph College in West Hartford, Connecticut. Additionally, Keller studied in Florence, Italy, with Nera Simi, and anatomy under David Rubins at the Herron School of Art in Indianapolis, Indiana.

Career
For 25 years Keller served as a professor at the Lyme Academy College of Fine Arts. The head of the drawing department, in 2001 he was honored with the endowed Deane G. Keller Chair of Classical Drawing and Figurative Art, a position which he held until his death. Keller was also a member of the faculty of the New York Academy of Art, the Art Students League of New York, the Hartford Art School at the University of Hartford, and the Woodstock School of Art. He lectured on drawing and draftsmanship at the Yale Center for British Art, the Wadsworth Atheneum, and the Graduate School of Design at Harvard University.

A portrait, landscape and still life painter, Keller was in his later years engaged in a series of large charcoal drawings of draped figures inspired by his travels to the Middle East.

Selected works
Keller authored numerous articles, and wrote two books.
 "The Fine Art of Drawing," American Artist. Vol. 64, No. 690 (2000): 20.  OCLC 92611357
 Figure Drawing in the Academy Tradition, 1890–1998
 2002 – Draftsman's Handbook: A Resource and Study Guide for Drawing from Life. Old Lyme, Connecticut: Lyme Academy College of Fine Arts.

Collections
Keller's work is in included in a number of public and private collections.

 Wadsworth Atheneum Museum of Art in Hartford, Connecticut
 Brandywine River Museum in Chadds Ford, Pennsylvania
 Slater Museum at the Norwich Free Academy in Norwich, Connecticut
 Woodstock School of Art
 Thomas Merton Center at Bellarmine University, Louisville, Kentucky
 Yale University
 Hospital of St. Raphael (where his statue of Mother Elizabeth Seton graces the entrance hall)
 Asylum Hill Congregational Church in Hartford
 Lyme Academy

Artists influenced by Keller
Keller believed that "for some years the fine art of draftsmanship has suffered some eclipse because learning the craft of figure drawing has been only casually addressed and even discredited by some." His students are evidence to the contrary.

 Eric Mannella
 Allana Benham
 T. Allen Lawson.

Notes

References
  "Deaths: Keller, Deane G.," New York Times.  July 13, 2007. Retrieved July 13, 2007.
  "Frontispiece:  Deane G. Keller (1940–2005)," Fine Art Coinnoisseur. July–August 2007.
 Keller, Deane G. Artist file : miscellaneous uncataloged material. 
 "The Fine Art of Drawing," American Artist. Vol. 64, No. 690 (2000): 20.  OCLC 92611357
 Miscellaneous ephemeral material. 
  Obituary: Dean G. Keller, Yale College Class of 1962. Retrieved November 1, 2009.
 Steiner, Raymond J.  "Deane G. Keller at The Woodstock School of Art,"  Art Times Journal. Summer 2006. Retrieved July 13, 2007.

External links
 Lyme Academy exhibition archives
 Press release for Lyme Academy exhibition at Saatchi website

1940 births
2005 deaths
Yale University alumni
Taft School alumni
Herron School of Art and Design alumni
University of Hartford faculty
Art Students League of New York faculty
American art educators